The  Stoppelberg is an extinct volcano near the town of Wetzlar in Germany.

References

External links 

Vier-Türme-Wanderung - a hike containing the Stoppelberg and related tourist information on website of Wetzlar

Mountains of Hesse
Mountains and hills of the Taunus